The 2017 Central Coast Pro Tennis Open was a professional tennis tournament played on outdoor hard courts. It was the first edition of the tournament and was part of the 2017 ITF Women's Circuit. It took place in Templeton, United States, on 25 September–1 October 2017.

Singles main draw entrants

Seeds 

 1 Rankings as of 18 September 2017.

Other entrants 
The following players received a wildcard into the singles main draw:
  Robin Anderson
  Quinn Gleason
  Taylor Townsend
  Sophia Whittle

The following players received entry by a special exempt:
  Emina Bektas
  Maria Sanchez

The following players received entry from the qualifying draw:
  Elena Bovina
  Alisa Kleybanova
  Sabrina Santamaria
  Anna Tatishvili

Champions

Singles

 Sachia Vickery def.  Jamie Loeb, 6–1, 6–2

Doubles
 
 Kaitlyn Christian /  Giuliana Olmos def.  Viktorija Golubic /  Amra Sadiković, 7–5, 6–3

External links 
 2017 Central Coast Pro Tennis Open at ITFtennis.com
 Official website

2017 ITF Women's Circuit
2017 in American tennis
Tennis tournaments in California